This is a list of episodes from the fourth season of Barnaby Jones.

Broadcast history
The season originally aired Fridays at 10:00-11:00 pm (EST) from September 19 to November 28, 1975 and Thursdays at 10:00-11:00 pm (EST) from December 4, 1975 to March 18, 1976.

Episodes

Barnaby Jones (season 4)